SAS Jan Smuts was a Minister-class strike craft of the South African Navy.

The SAS Jan Smuts was the first of the Minister class to be built and initially launched with only a pennant number, P1561. She arrived in Simon's Town in September 1977 under the command of Commander Robert Simpson-Anderson. She was later named SAS Jan Smuts after former Prime Minister Jan Smuts.

When the strike craft were renamed in 1997, the SAS Jan Smuts was the only one to retain her original name.

She was withdrawn from service on 20 March 1998 and sold for scrap.

References

1977 ships
Missile boats of the South African Navy
Israel–South Africa relations